The 2011 El Reno–Piedmont tornado was a long-tracked, violent, and deadly EF5 tornado that struck central Oklahoma on the evening of May 24, 2011. The tornado impacted areas near or within the communities of El Reno, Piedmont, and Guthrie, killing nine and injuring 181. It was the first tornado rated EF5 or F5 to strike Oklahoma since the 1999 Bridge Creek–Moore tornado.

2011 was a prolific year for both tornadoes and tornado-associated fatalities, with multiple destructive outbreaks: the El Reno–Piedmont tornado occurred in the context of a wider severe weather episode across Oklahoma and the Great Plains that produced multiple violent tornadoes outside the Oklahoma City metropolitan area on May 24, which was itself part of a tornado outbreak sequence spanning May 21 to May 26, 2011. The Oklahoma storms came just two days after a devastating EF5 tornado in Joplin, Missouri on May 22, which killed 158 people and became the costliest tornado in U.S. history.

El Reno has infamously been the site of several other intense tornadoes. The large, multiple-vortex tornado killed eight people, including three storm chasers, and received a damage rating of EF3. In 2019, a brief tornado born from an intense squall line struck just southeast of El Reno, killing two people and injuring dozens, again receiving a rating of EF3.

Meteorological synopsis

Ingredients 
Early on May 24 a strong upper-level trough (an elongated region of low atmospheric pressure aloft) advanced towards the Great Plains out of the southwestern United States, and took on a negative tilt, becoming oriented northwest to southeast.

At the same time, southerly flow brought moisture north over Texas and the southern Great Plains, allowing dew points in Central Oklahoma to reach . This moisture, with temperatures in the mid  range, allowed for ample convective available potential energy (or CAPE, a measure of atmospheric instability); values reached 2500–4000 J/kg. Mid-level lapse rates were nearly dry adiabatic.

In the late morning, a shortwave embedded within the main longwave trough advanced more rapidly, pushing the dryline into western Oklahoma, where it met the already-present moisture. The shortwave's advance also brought strong wind shear and "incredibly high" storm-relative helicity values of more than 500 m2s-2. The convergence of all these factors promised the development of intense convective thunderstorms.

Forecast 

This risk was anticipated by the National Weather Service's Storm Prediction Center (SPC), and its local forecast office in Norman, Oklahoma. The Storm Prediction Center's outlooks for severe weather culminated in a "high risk" area being delineated over the Great Plains for May 24. Issued at 11:25 a.m. CDT, the Storm Prediction Center's convective outlook for the day highlighted the tornado risk, placing central Oklahoma in the bulls-eye for a large region that could expect a 45% chance of a tornado within  of any given point, and a 10% chance of a significant (EF2+) tornado within that same 25-mile radius.

At 12:50 p.m., the Storm Prediction Center issued a Particularly Dangerous Situation (PDS) tornado watch, to remain in effect until 10:00 p.m., for most of central Oklahoma extending from the state border with Kansas down through the Oklahoma City metropolitan area and into northern Texas. The text of the tornado watch again warned of the possible development of "destructive tornadoes... …some of which could be long-tracked and strong to violent."

Initiation 
Thunderstorms began to develop before 2:00 p.m. in a north-south oriented line, just east of the dryline where the capping inversion was weakest, including near Altus and Lawton in southwest Oklahoma. The tightly-spaced storm cells rapidly developed classic supercell characteristics as they moved northeast.

Storm track and damage 
The supercell that eventually generated the El Reno–Piedmont tornado first produced a tornado in Caddo County, Oklahoma, which tracked from west of the town of Lookeba to just northeast of it. The Lookeba tornado developed at 3:31 p.m., and persisted for approximately 16 minutes, during which time it traveled  and destroyed multiple structures. The -wide tornado earned a damage rating of EF3. As the Lookeba tornado moved northeast towards the Caddo/Canadian county border, between 3:40 and 3:42 p.m. the supercell's mesocyclone broadened and weakened slightly; this was followed by the development of a second mesocyclone from the original to the east-southeast between 3:42 and 3:44 p.m. This marked the start of the decay of the Lookeba tornado, which fully dissipated by 3:47 p.m. Over the next several minutes the original western mesocyclone dwindled as the newer mesocyclone coalesced, and the radar detection of a bounded weak echo region within the storm indicated that its updraft intensified during this period.

Hinton–Interstate 40 
The El Reno–Piedmont tornado formed at 3:51 p.m., as determined by mobile radar data. Over the next four minutes, the tornado's condensation funnel extending from a low-hanging wall cloud broadened, causing the tornado to take on a large 'wedge' appearance. It intensified quickly as it moved northeast, debarking and destroying many trees. During this period, the storm was being monitored by a truck-mounted Rapid-Scan X-band Polarimetric (RaXPol) mobile Doppler weather radar, operated by the University of Oklahoma's Advanced Radar Research Center (ARRC) led by Howard Bluestein.

As the tornado moved towards I-40 to the southeast of the RaXPol radar, it detected some of the fastest wind speeds ever measured on the planet. This was reported as "likely to be an underestimate of the true 2- and 4-s average wind speeds."

Where the most intense winds are generally present in a tornado is an unresolved question, but the limited existing research suggests that wind speeds are likely to be highest closer to the ground. After the detection of the wind speeds, the quality of the data degraded until collection ceased altogether at 4:16 p.m., as the tornado progressed to the northeast and towards I-40 where it would produce its most intense damage.

Interstate 40–El Reno 
There, the tornado struck multiple people in their cars. Three people—Terry Peoples, 50; Don Wesley Krug, 71; and Joan Krug, 67—were killed in two separate full-size pickup trucks, which were hurled thousands of feet from the road. Several others were injured here as their vehicles were battered and overturned, including a truck driver whose semi truck was flipped. The interstate was left littered with pieces of cars. Two more fatalities in cars occurred just northeast of the interstate.

According to the National Weather Service, the tornado is believed to have peaked in intensity just after crossing I-40. There, the tornado struck the Cactus 117 oil drilling rig site, completely destroying it. Despite this, and despite the fact that the drilling rig weighed 862 metric tons—or almost two million pounds—the rig was toppled onto its side and rolled several times. The well's blowout preventer was left bent at a 30 degree angle to the north. Elsewhere on the site, vehicles and cargo containers were lofted into the air and tossed.

Twelve workers were on the site when the tornado struck, and took shelter in the site's change house (a steel container serving as a locker room). One cable broke and the container was dented, but all twelve workers survived without serious injury. The move to tie down change houses for tornado shelters at Cactus drilling rigs had come less than a year before the El Reno–Piedmont tornado, and following the storm Cactus moved to reinforce the change house roofs and position them where the rig would be less likely to topple on to them. Damage at the Cactus 117 rig amounted to $14 million.

After destroying the Cactus rig, the tornado continued moving northeast. Just to the west of the rig, it struck a complex of buildings (including a scrap yard, auto repair shop, garage, and grain storage facility). The repair shop, the garage, and a farmhouse were destroyed and the grain facility "damaged beyond repair." Flying debris from the salvage yard impacted a new natural gas processing plant operated by Devon Energy, but all employees present avoided injury by sheltering on-site in time. The damage caused an incident at the plant major gas leak at the plant, which was not secured until nightfall. The gust was the highest wind speed ever recorded by the Oklahoma Mesonet. The site sustained only minor damage, the tornado likely having passed several hundred yards from it. Fort Reno sustained some structural damage.

El Reno–Piedmont 

Leaving the environs of El Reno, the tornado then tracked through miles of mainly agricultural land. Widespread EF3 damage, pockmarked with areas of EF4 damage, was found between the towns of El Reno and Piedmont. 

During the tornado's journey between El Reno and Piedmont, at least two satellite tornadoes were present at different times. The first was only recognized after-the-fact using radar data. That data shows the El Reno–Piedmont tornado and a separate cyclonic tornado, originating from the same mesocyclone, rotating in a counterclockwise fashion about a single common center (in a demonstration of the Fujiwhara effect) for several minutes, before merging at approximately 4:35 p.m. The second satellite came just minutes later.

Piedmont–Guthrie 

As the tornado neared Piedmont, it produced widespread EF4 damage north and west of the town.  north of Piedmont, the tornado leveled 10 homes on Northridge Lane and rolled or lofted vehicles into nearby fields. However, surveys found that nails had been used to help fasten the walls to their concrete slab foundations, which failed and left broken portions of the slabs where they had been driven in to them. A Chevrolet Avalanche parked in the garage of one of the residences was hurled  to the northeast and into a thicket of trees in a ravine, which were debarked and relieved of their branches. The Chevrolet's engine block and axles were found nearby, ripped from the car. The damage here was assigned an EF4 rating. Vehicles were tossed into an adjacent lake. Two children (aged 1 and 3) were killed in their home, which lacked a storm shelter. All told, the tornado destroyed 88 homes in the Piedmont area.

EF2 and EF3 damage still occurred as the tornado damaged houses, destroyed multiple mobile homes, and collapsed high-voltage transmission towers, while continuing to debark trees to the point where only stumps remained. The tornado killed two more people—caught outside without shelter—near the community of Cashion. Along SH-74, the tornado destroyed three homes and an airplane hangar. The tornado approached Guthrie, but moved northwest of the town, which avoided a direct hit. The tornado finally dissipated northeast of Guthrie, producing only minor tree damage there.

The tornado's parent supercell went on to produce another tornado south of the community of Stillwater, which earned a damage rating of EF2.

Summary 

On June 1, 2011, National Weather Service officials upgraded the tornado's original preliminary EF4 rating to EF5, based on a combination of the damage to the Cactus 117 drilling rig site, the complete destruction of other buildings in the rig's vicinity, tossed vehicles, and the mobile radar data.

In the end, 22 tornadoes occurred in central Oklahoma. In the Oklahoma City area, five main supercells produced 12 tornadoes, three of them violent (EF4+). The El Reno–Piedmont tornado was the strongest of them all.The El Reno–Piedmont tornado became one of only 59 tornadoes ever rated F5 or EF5, and one of only nine tornadoes to receive an EF5 rating since the advent of the Enhanced Fujita scale in 2007. It was also the first tornado in Oklahoma to receive an EF5 rating, and the only one until the 2013 Moore tornado.

Impacts 

Following the tornado, first responders in Canadian County scoured the  debris path in the corridor west of El Reno near the interstate. Three emergency operations centers were established in Canadian County: near Piedmont, El Reno, and Interstate 40.

Casualties 
The El Reno–Piedmont tornado killed nine people and injured 181, making it responsible for the majority of the casualties caused by the entire outbreak (in which 11 died and 293 were injured). Of that total, seven deaths and 112 injuries occurred in Canadian County, 46 injuries occurred in Kingfisher County, and two deaths and 23 injuries occurred in Logan County. Three children with critical injuries in Piedmont numbered among the casualties in Canadian County.

In an overview of the outbreak in a paper presented at the annual American Meteorological Society conference, National Weather Service authors speculated that the relatively low number of fatalities during the outbreak (which involved three violent tornadoes near a major metropolitan area) was due in part due to "the incredible reaction of the community to not only watches and warnings, but also to the forecast of severe weather" on May 24.

Damage 
The Devon Energy natural gas plant near El Reno was forced offline for several weeks as the company assessed and repaired the $140 million facility.

Though the amount of $14 million was given as the cost of damage to the Cactus 117 drilling rig site in news reports, a detailed monetary damage estimate by NWS/NOAA for the El Reno–Piedmont tornado was not made available. The only government assessment of damages appears in the tornado's entry in NOAA's NCEI Storm Events Database, which predicted that the total was "probably going to be well in the tens of millions." Meanwhile, insurance officials reported an estimated $200-300 million in total private property insured losses from the Oklahoma portion of the tornado outbreak.

The city of Piedmont paid $230,380 for debris removal, 75% of which was reimbursed by FEMA.

Political response 
Governor of Oklahoma Mary Fallin declared a state of emergency in 68 counties on May 24, including Canadian, Kingfisher, and Logan counties, before taking to the air to survey damage in a number of areas, which included Piedmont and Guthrie. On May 29, Governor Fallin requested that the White House issue a federal major disaster declaration for seven Oklahoma counties, again including Canadian, Kingfisher, and Logan counties. On June 6, President Obama approved Governor Fallin’s request for federal disaster relief.

In September 2011, Governor Fallin and state emergency management officials announced the SoonerSafe-Safe Room Rebate Program, using $1 million in FEMA funds, which distributed cash rebates via a statewide drawing to reimburse up to 500 Oklahomans seeking to build storm shelters. Victims of the May 24 tornado outbreak were among those who received priority selection for the rebates.

See also 
 Glossary of meteorology
 List of F5 and EF5 tornadoes
 Tornadoes of 2011
 List of United States tornadoes in May 2011
 2013 Moore tornado

References

External links 
 National Weather Service, Norman, OK - The May 24, 2011 Tornado Outbreak in Oklahoma
 NOAA Damage Assessment Toolkit

Tornadoes in Oklahoma
Tornadoes of 2011
2011 in Oklahoma
2011 natural disasters in the United States
May 2011 events in the United States
F5 tornadoes by date